This article presents a list of the historical events and publications of Australian literature during 1892.

Events 

 9 July - Henry Lawson kicks off the Bulletin Debate with the publication of his poem "Borderland", later retitled "Up the Country". "Banjo" Paterson and others replied.

Books 

 Francis Adams
 Australian Life
 The Melbournians: A Novel
 Fergus Hume — The Island of Fantasy: A Romance
 John Miller — The Workingman's Paradise: An Australian Labour Novel
 Hume Nisbet
 The Bushranger's Sweetheart: An Australian Romance
 The Divers: A Romance of Oceania
 Rosa Praed
  'December Roses': A Novel
 The Romance of a Chalet

Poetry 

 Barcroft Boake
 "An Allegory"
 "At Devlin's Siding"
 "Down the River"
 "Jim's Whip"
 Jennings Carmichael – "An Old Bush Road"
 Victor J. Daley
 "A-Roving"
 "Cares"
 Edward Dyson
 "Cleaning Up"
 "The Fact of the Matter"
 "The Old Whim Horse"
 "Struck It At Last"
 George Essex Evans — "The Two Goblets"
 Sydney Jephcott — The Secrets of the South: Australian Poems
 Francis Kenna — "Banjo, of the Overflow"
 Henry Lawson
 "The City Bushman"
 "The Grog-an'-Grumble Steeplechase"
 "In Answer to "Banjo", and Otherwise"
 "The Poets of the Tomb"
 "Up the Country"
 Louisa Lawson
 "A Birthday Wish"
 "To a Bird"
 Breaker Morant
 "Brigalow Mick"
 "The Nights at Rocky Bar"
 Henry Parkes — "Weary"
 A. B. Paterson
 "In Answer to Various Bards"
 "The Ballad of G.R. Dibbs"
 "A Bushman's Song"
 "In Defence of the Bush"
 "The Man from Ironbark"

Short stories 
 John Arthur Barry — "Far Inland Football"
 Ernest Favenc
 "How the Reverend Joseph Simmondsen Lost His Character"
 "The Track of the Dead"
 E. W. Hornung - Under Two Skies: A Collection of Stories
 Henry Lawson
 "The Bush Undertaker"
 "A Day on a Selection"
 "The Drover's Wife"
 "In a Dry Season"
 "A Visit of Condolence"
 Price Warung
 "At Burford's Panorama"
 "Beneath the Summer Sun"
 "Bess O' the Rivers"
 "The Heart-Breaking of Anstey's Bess"
 "Parson Ford's Confessional"

Births 

A list, ordered by date of birth (and, if the date is either unspecified or repeated, ordered alphabetically by surname) of births in 1892 of Australian literary figures, authors of written works or literature-related individuals follows, including year of death.

 17 May — Leon Gellert, poet (died 1977)

Unknown date
 Elsie Clarice Cole, poet (died 1968)

Deaths 

A list, ordered by date of death (and, if the date is either unspecified or repeated, ordered alphabetically by surname) of deaths in 1892 of Australian literary figures, authors of written works or literature-related individuals follows, including year of birth.

 2 May — Barcroft Boake, poet (born 1866)

See also 
 1892 in poetry
 List of years in literature
 List of years in Australian literature
 1892 in literature
 1891 in Australian literature
 1892 in Australia
 1893 in Australian literature

References

Literature
Australian literature by year
19th-century Australian literature
1892 in literature